Hyderabad Division  is an administrative division of the Sindh Province of Pakistan. It was abolished in 2000 but restored again on 11 July 2011.

Hyderabad is the divisional headquarters of Hyderabad Division.  Following the separation of the Badin, Sujawal and Thatta Districts out of Hyderabad Division to form the new Banbhore Division, the residual Hyderabad Division now comprises six districts:

Districts

History
During colonial rule, the erstwhile division was a district of Sind in what was then the Bombay Presidency of British India. The population of the district increased by 47% between 1872 and 1901. The total population according to the census were 677,994 in 1872, 703,637 in 1881, 861,994 in 1891 and 989,030 in 1901.

After independence in 1947 the district became a division until its dissolution in 2000, the division comprised the districts of Badin, Hyderabad and Tando Allahyar.

On 11 July 2011 Sindh Government restored again Hyderabad division.

See also
 Hyderabad

References

Divisions of Sindh